Tupilak-41 is a sports club from Greenland based in Aasiaat, after having relocated from Qaanaaq. They compete in the Coca Cola GM.

Achievements 
Coca Cola GM: 1
Champion : 1971
Youth Champion : 1997

External links
 Greenland Football Association Official website

Football clubs in Greenland
Association football clubs established in 1941
1941 establishments in Greenland